

Team

Final roster

Depth chart

Squad changes

Extensions 

|}

In 

|}

Out

|}

Club uniform

Competitions

Statistics

Individual statistics Serie A

Individual statistics Euroleague

Season individual statistics

References

External links 
 

2018–19 EuroLeague by club
2018–19 in European basketball by club
2018–19 in Italian basketball
Olimpia Milano seasons
Season